Weida can refer to the following:
Weida (Salza), the name of a section of the Salza, a river of Saxony-Anhalt, Germany
Weida, Thuringia, a town in Thuringia, Germany
Weida (White Elster), a river of Thuringia, Germany, tributary of the White Elster 
Weida-Land, a Verwaltungsgemeinschaft in Saxony-Anhalt, Germany